Farewell Tour is the first live album by American rock band The Doobie Brothers, released in 1983. It documents the group's 1982 Farewell Tour and is a double album set.

By the early 1980s, the Doobie Brothers had evolved from the guitar-boogie sound under original band frontman Tom Johnston to a soulful keyboard-driven AOR sound under Michael McDonald.  Despite the many personnel changes in the group, Patrick Simmons remained from the original incarnation of the group.

In 1982, Simmons decided to retire from the group after years of constant touring and recording.  When the band decided to break up in light of his impending departure, Simmons encouraged the group to make one last tour during the summer of 1982 as a way of thanking the group's loyal fanbase.  This tour became known as the "Farewell Tour."

The front cover shows drummer Keith Knudsen cutting the strings on John McFee's guitar as a symbolic gesture.  The last two songs on the album were recorded at the final concert of the tour in Berkeley, California, on September 11, 1982, with vocals by original lead vocalist and guitarist Tom Johnston.  For a long time the album was available on CD only in Japan, but ultimately it was re-released on CD by Rhino/WEA on August 26, 2008. The reissue deleted approximately 1 minutes of onstage talk from Patrick Simmons between 'Jesus' and 'Minute by Minute', including mentioning that the band were going to "light up a 'doobie'" during intermission, suggesting the audience do the same.

Track listing

"Can't Let It Get Away" and "Olana" are songs that the band had recorded in the studio but not released on albums. The studio version of "Can't Let It Get Away" was released only in Japan in 1981, while the studio version of "Olana" remained unreleased until it appeared on Long Train Runnin': 1970-2000.

Personnel
Patrick Simmons – electric and acoustic guitars, lead and backing vocals
John McFee – electric and acoustic guitars, pedal steel guitar on "Steamer Lane Breakdown" and "South City Midnight Lady", electric violin on "Black Water", backing vocals
Willie Weeks – bass, backing vocals
Michael McDonald – keyboards, synthesizers, lead and backing vocals
Cornelius Bumpus – tenor saxophone, soprano saxophone on "Black Water", Hammond organ, synthesizers, backing vocals, lead vocal on "Jesus Is Just Alright"
Keith Knudsen – drums, tambourine on "Black Water", backing vocals, lead vocal on "Don't Start Me Talkin'"
Chet McCracken – drums, vibraphone on "You Belong to Me" and "South City Midnight Lady", tambourine and timbales on "Long Train Runnin'"
Bobby LaKind – congas, bongos, percussion, backing vocals

Guests
Tom Johnston – electric guitar and lead vocals on "China Grove" and "Long Train Runnin'" (and "Slippery St. Paul")
Joe Crowley – harmonica on "Don't Start Me Talkin'"

Dave Shogren & John Hartman appear, uncredited, on "Slippery St. Paul."

Production
Producer: Ted Templeman
Engineer: Jim Isaacson
Management: Bruce Cohn
Mastered by Bobby Hata at Warner Bros. Recording Studios, North Hollywood
Production coordinator: Joan Parker
Publicity: David Gest & Associates
Album recorded by the Record Plant (technicians: Jack Crymes, Mark Eschelman, Gary Singleman, Jim Scott)
Tour manager: Joe Crowley, Jeff Mills (assistant)
Production manager: Lol Halsey, Rollie Clasen (assistant)
Live sound mixer: David Morgan
Monitor mixer: Mike Kelley
Guitar technician/Stage manager: Mark Brown
Guitar, violin, pedal steel technician: David Bowers
Keyboard technician: Alan Bartz
Drum technician: Greg Winter
Live sound technicians: Mark Drale, Alan Bonomo, Philip Ashley at Innovative Audio
Lighting director: Martin Wolff
Art direction and design: Jay Vigon
Photography: Chris Callis, Michael Simpson (assistant)
Special thanks to Sam Schniable, Michael Barbieri, Doug Brunkow, Bob Walker, Tad Inferrera, Brent Anderson, Shep Lonsdale, Oscar Harris, Ralph Cain, Dalton Perry, Harry Hughes, Sam & Donna Stewart, Linda Patrick, Leslie Wiener, Bob Gordon, Kathy Nelson, Carol Miller

Charts

References

Albums produced by Ted Templeman
The Doobie Brothers live albums
1983 live albums
Warner Records live albums
Rhino Records live albums